This article includes detailed statistics of the COVID-19 pandemic in Australia.

Summary

Cases 

The numbers of cases in the charts below referred to the number of cases at the end of each day (23:59 AEDT) until 4 April 2020. Since 5 April 2020, the federal government standardised the daily case number release time to 15:00 AEST which has been reflected in the data.

This data has been compiled by recording the daily values from the infographic available under "Current Status" on the Australian Government's Department of Health website. Under National Notifiable Diseases Surveillance System reporting requirements, cases are reported based on their Australian jurisdiction of residence rather than where they were detected.

Cumulative cases

Daily confirmed cases

Active cases 
As of  12 October 2021, there were 26,448 estimated active cases of COVID-19 in Australia. A case is considered active if a person who was COVID-19 positive but has yet to be classified as recovered and has not died. The chart below tracks active cases since 5 April 2020, when the Federal Government began reporting nationwide recovery data. However, since 20 July 2020, the Federal Government began reporting official estimation of nationwide active cases and this has been reflected in the chart.

Clusters 

The largest cluster in Australia from the start of the pandemic until 5 November 2021, when Australia reached its 80 percent vaccination target and entered the consolidation phase of its COVID-19 transition plan, was the Flemington/North Melbourne public housing cluster with 310 cases. The deadliest cluster in Australia was at St Basil's Homes for the Aged in Victoria, where 45 residents died.

Deaths 
As of 12 October 2021, officially 1,461 people linked to COVID-19 have died in Australia. At least 753 deaths were residents in aged care facilities, and at least 29 deaths had been passengers or crew on cruise ships.

Cases and deaths by age group and gender 
The following table represents the number of cases and deaths for each age group and gender as of 29 December 2021. The data is sourced from the National Notifiable Diseases Surveillance System (NNDSS) and the Federal Government.

References

COVID-19 pandemic in Australia
Australia